Kezen (also known as Gazan, Gezen-e Bālā, Kezen Bālā, Kezen-e Bālā, and Najafābād) is a village in Vardasht Rural District, in the Central District of Semirom County, Isfahan Province, Iran. According to the 2016 census, its population was 206 people.

References 

Populated places in Semirom County